Lisandro José Macarulla Tavárez (Santo Domingo, 19 December 1956) is a businessman and entrepreneurial leader from the Dominican Republic.

Early life, family and education 
Lisandro José Macarulla Tavárez was born on 19 December 1956 in Santo Domingo within an affluent white Dominican family.

Macarrulla has a degree in Business management with a Master in Finance/ Service Management from the Rochester Institute of Technology in New York State, United States.

Business career

He presides Grupo MAC, one of Dominican Republic's largest companies, having investments in real estate, tourism and construction.

Macarrulla was president of Industries Association of the Dominican Republic (AIRD), of the Asociación de Industrias de Materiales de Construcción, of the Asociación de Productores de Cemento del Caribe, of the Federación Iberoamericana de Cemento and two-times president of National Council of Private Enterprises (CONEP). As philanthropist he is the head of "Asociación Ciudad Ovando" an NGO that seeks the preservation of historical places in Santo Domingo's Colonial City.

Grupo MAC 
El Grupo MAC es un holding de empresas e inversiones multinacionales que dirige Lisandro Macarrulla y sus familiares, las empresas e inversiones pertenecientes an este grupo se encuentran divididas en:

MAC Industrias y Puertos 
 Consorcio VMO compuesto por VMO Industrias y VMO Concretos dedicados a la fabricación y comercialización de materiales de construcción
 DOMICEM: Industria de cemento con presencia en República Dominicana, Haití y Jamaica donde comparte inversiones con Grupo Inicia de la poderosa Familia Vicini y la empresa italiana Colacem.

MAC Inmobiliaria 
 CONDI: Administradora de activos inmobiliarios en República Dominicana y otros países.
 Inversiones Turísticas Sans Souci: Administradora del Puerto Sans Souci y desarrolladora de proyectos inmobiliarios, turísticos, hoteleros y de negocios en la zona de Sans Souci
 MAC CC: Desarrolladora inmobiliaria de propiedades exclusivas en el casco histórico de la Ciudad Colonial de Santo Domingo.

MAC Ingeniería 
 MAC Construcciones: Subsidiaria del Grupo MAC dedicada al desarrollo inmobiliario habitacional con proyectos que incluyen La Nueva Barquita
River Construction Group Group (RCG): Empresa de desarrollo inmobiliario público y privado.
Internacional de Servicios Marítimos: Empresa dedicada an ofrecer servicios marítimos diversos en todo el Caribe

MAC Puertos y Logística 
 Sans Souci Ports: Puerto privado multipropósito y el principal puerto de la ciudad de Santo Domingo.
 Marina & Yacht Club: Marina y puerto deportivo ubicada en Santo Domingo
  Fast Auto Logistics: Empresa de logística marítima.

MAC Turismo 
 Milan Worldwide: Empresa propietaria de Hotel Hodelpa Nicolás de Ovando, Hotel Casa Real y Hotel Novus Plaza en la Ciudad Colonial de Santo Domingo.

References 

1956 births
Dominican Republic businesspeople
People from Santo Domingo
Dominican Republic people of Catalan descent
Dominican Republic people of French descent
Dominican Republic people of Italian descent
Government ministers of the Dominican Republic
Modern Revolutionary Party politicians
White Dominicans
Living people